The 1st Laotian Parachute Battalion (1st BPL) was a  paratroop battalion of the French Union Army formed in Vientiane, French Indochina in 1951. It was composed of French officers and Laotian non-commissioned officers and enlisted men, and fought in the First Indochina War.

History 
The 1st BPL began forming in October 1951 at Chinaimo near Vientiane, and reached a strength of 853 men in a headquarters and three companies by 1 April 1952. Its 2nd Company was formed from Commandos 4, 5, and 6 of the 1st Laotian Para-Commando Company. During 1952 it was involved in twenty operations, six of which involved parachute jumps. Between 15 and 24 December 576 men from the unit parachuted into Sam Neua to reinforce its garrison in Operation Noel; they were reinforced by eighty more to form a fourth company in February 1953. The Sam Neua garrison was defeated by a Vietminh invasion of 40,000 troops commanded by General Võ Nguyên Giáp, forcing the remnants of the 1st BPL to flee toward the Plain of Jars.

It was reformed at Chinaimo a month later, and conducted reconnaissance and commando operations north of Luang Prabang for the rest of the year, including Operation Dampieres in September. The 1st BPL began preparing for Operation Condor, an attempt to relieve the Dien Bien Phu garrison, during March 1954. It advanced towards the Laotian-Vietnamese border in April and early May, withdrawing in mid-May after the garrison surrendered. The BPL reunited on 18 June near Savannakhet at the French Air Force's Seno Airbase. Between 2 and 4 August it conducted the final airborne operation of the war, in which it parachuted into the town of Phanop in Khammouane Province, linking up with local militia units and sweeping the territory up to Mụ Giạ Pass on the Vietnamese border.

Following the implementation of the Indochina ceasefire on 6 August, the 1st BPL with 981 personnel returned to Seno and transferred to the Laotian National Army. Following the October departure of its French officers, the unit was redesignated the 1st Parachute Battalion (French: 1er Bataillon Parachutiste – 1er BP).

See also
 
Royal Lao Army Airborne

References

Citations

Bibliography 

 

Parachute infantry battalions of France
Military units and formations of the First Indochina War
Laotian Parachute Battalion
Laotian Parachute Regiment
Laotian Parachute Battalion